Ali Yaşar (born 8 March 1995) is a Belgian footballer who plays as a left back for Turkish club İstanbulspor.

Club career 

Yaşar is a youth exponent from Standard Liège. At 2 August 2014, he made his Belgian Pro League debut with Standard Liège against K.V. Kortrijk in a 2–3 away win. He played the first 45 minutes of the game, before being substituted by Jelle Van Damme. On 30 January 2016, he moved to Roda where he initially played for their U21 side. After a brief stint with Anadolu Selçukspor, he moved to Konyaspor in 2018 and immediately went on loan to Altınordu in the TFF First League. He returned to Altınordu on another loan in January 2020. He moved to İstanbulspor on 24 August 2020 in the TFF First League, and in the 2021-22 season helped them achieve promotion into the Süper Lig.

International career
Born in Belgium, Yaşar is of Turkish descent. He is a youth international for Belgium, having represented them until the U19s.

References

External links
 

1995 births
Living people
Footballers from Liège
Belgian footballers
Belgium youth international footballers
Belgian people of Turkish descent
Standard Liège players
Roda JC Kerkrade players
1922 Konyaspor footballers
Konyaspor footballers
Altınordu F.K. players
İstanbulspor footballers
Belgian Pro League players
Eredivisie players
Süper Lig players
TFF First League players
TFF Second League players
Association football defenders